Cherating (Jawi: چراتيڠ) is a coastal town in Kuantan District, Pahang, Malaysia. Popular tourist attractions are the beaches along the Chendor Beach with many hotels and resorts. Cherating also has the distinction of being the  location of Asia's first Club Med.

Cherating has a cultural village which sells traditional textiles and handicrafts. There is a turtle sanctuary located in Cherating's beach. The turtles lay their eggs in July and August.

Climate 
Cherating is one of the wettest places in Malaysia with heavy rainfall all year round. The rainy season usually runs from October - April and many hotels and restaurants close during this time. The high (dry) season runs from April - October.

See also
Teluk Cempedak
Tanjung Sepat, Pahang
Batu Hitam

References

Towns in Pahang
Populated places in Pahang
Seaside resorts
Beaches of Malaysia